https://peakvisor.com/peak/hatun-rit-iyuq.html

It lies in the Cusco Region, Canchis Province, Pitumarca District, and in the Quispicanchi Province, Cusipata District. Jatunrritioc is situated south of the mountain Huasacocha, north-west of the mountain Yaritani and north-east of the mountain Chachacomayoc.

References

Mountains of Peru
Mountains of Cusco Region